Shahidabad may refer to:

Shahidabad, Fars
Shahidabad, Manujan, Kerman Province
Shahidabad, Qaleh Ganj, Kerman Province
Shahidabad, Rudbar-e Jonubi, Kerman Province
Shahidabad-e Tang Seh Riz, Kohgiluyeh and Boyer-Ahmad Province
Shahidabad, Amol, Mazandaran Province
Shahidabad, Babol, Mazandaran Province
Shahidabad, Behshahr, Mazandaran Province
Shahidabad, Qazvin
Shahidabad, Razavi Khorasan
Shahidabad-e Saruk, Khash County, Sistan and Baluchestan Province
Shahidabad, Zanjan
Shahidabad Rural District (disambiguation)